Nordenau is a locality in the municipality Schmallenberg in the High Sauerland District in North Rhine-Westphalia, Germany.

The village has 209 inhabitants and lies in the east of the municipality of Schmallenberg at a height of around 584 m. The river Nesselbach flows through the village.  Nordenau borders on the villages of Nesselbach, Lengenbeck, Inderlenne, Westfeld and Ohlenbach.

Around 1200 the castle Norderna (today Rappelstein castle ruin) was built by the noblemen by Grafschaft beside the old Heidenstraße. The village used to belong to the municipality of Oberkirchen in Amt Schmallenberg until the end of 1974.

Gallery

External links 
Nordenau

References

Villages in North Rhine-Westphalia
Schmallenberg